is a Japanese diplomat who served as Japanese Ambassador to Estonia and Finland from 2009 to 2012.

He studied economics at the University of Tokyo.

He entered the Japanese Ministry of Transport in 1972, and served as director of the Public Relations Office, the Aviation Industries Division and the Road Transport Bureau. From 2005 to 2009 he served as Vice-Minister of Land, Infrastructure and Transport.

See also
 List of Ambassadors of Japan to Finland

References

1949 births
Living people
Japanese politicians
Ambassadors of Japan to Estonia
Ambassadors of Japan to Finland